This article provides two lists:
A list of NBA career regular season three-point field goals made.
A progressive list of three-point leaders showing how the record has increased through the years.

List of 3-point scoring leaders

Statistics accurate as of March 16, 2023.

Progressive list of 3-point scoring leaders
This is a progressive list of 3-point scoring leaders showing how the record has increased through the years.
Statistics accurate as of March 16, 2023.

See also

Notes

References

External links 
Basketball-Reference.com enumeration of NBA career leaders in 3-point field goals made
National Basketball Association official website enumeration of NBA career leaders in 3-point field goals made

National Basketball Association lists
National Basketball Association statistical leaders